Mikhail Shchapov (born 20 September 1975, Kirensk, Irkutsk Oblast) is a Russian political figure, FSB Lieutenant colonel, and a deputy of the 7th and 8th State Dumas.
 
At the beginning of the 2000s, Shchapov served at the Federal Security Service. In 2010, he retired from the service and engaged in business. In 2011, he co-founded the agricultural enterprise AgroBaikal. From 2013 to 2016, he was the deputy of the Legislative Assembly of Irkutsk Oblast of the 2nd convocation. In 2016 and 2021, he was elected deputy of the 7th and 8th State Dumas, respectively.

References

 

1975 births
Living people
Communist Party of the Russian Federation members
21st-century Russian politicians
Eighth convocation members of the State Duma (Russian Federation)
Seventh convocation members of the State Duma (Russian Federation)